Competitive yoga is the performance of asanas in sporting competitions. The activity is controversial as it appears to conflict with the nature of yoga.

History

The International Federation of Sports Yoga has organised annual championships since 1989, and is led by Fernando Estevez-Griego (Swami Maitreyananda). These competitions are not restricted to asanas, but cover all eight limbs of yoga identified in the Yoga Sutras of Patanjali. The 1989 competition was held in Montevideo with the asana competition in Pondicherry.

Competitive yoga has been practised by adults in America since 2009 under the auspices of the nonprofit organisation USA Yoga; competitions were later introduced for children from the age of 7. The fiercely contested Bishnu Charan Ghosh Cup is held annually in Los Angeles. Ghosh inspired the yoga style of Bikram Choudhury, the founder of Bikram Yoga, and Choudhury has been closely associated with America's competitive yoga from its inception. 

The documentary film Posture by Nathan Bender and Daniel Nelson portrays competitors and detractors of the USA Yoga Federation National Championship.

Sport or spiritual

The idea of competitive yoga seems an oxymoron to some people in the yoga community. The author Rajiv Malhotra described competitive yoga as "a form of misappropriation". The yoga teacher Loretta Turner called the term "offensive, because yoga is much more than posturing". The journalist Neal Pollack said that the goal of all types of yoga is samadhi, "enlightened bliss where the ego separates from the self and the practitioner realizes that he's powerless to control the vagaries of an endlessly shifting universe". Instead, Pollack continued, yoga competitions consist of the performance of asanas derived from hatha yoga. He concluded that he was not sure what he had witnessed, but he was glad to return to his usual modest yoga, free of competitiveness.

Yoga practitioners and their instructors commonly work to avoid any feeling of competitiveness. The yoga instructor Tanya Boulton comments that yoga is challenging because it teaches people not to be competitive but to be at peace with themselves. Practitioners are advised not to compare themselves to other people in their class, and to accept that yoga is an inner thing, not a matter of physical perfection.

References 

Yoga styles